The Metro Headquarters Building (or One Gateway Plaza) is a 398 ft (121 m) high rise office tower in Los Angeles, California. It is located in Northeastern Downtown Los Angeles, east across the tracks from Union Station.

Completed in 1995, it serves as the main headquarters for the Los Angeles County Metropolitan Transportation Authority.

Building

The $145.5 million building is the main fixture of the Patsaouras Transit Plaza and features exquisite artwork throughout the exterior facades and the interior lobby. The main boardroom seats 350 people. The building's design features a blend of contextual influences of 1930s Hispanic-Deco and post-modern architecture. It features four levels of underground parking.

The construction of this building was filmed in the 1994 children's video There Goes a Bulldozer, where Dave Hood climbed a tower crane.

In the Star Trek: Voyager episode "Future's End", a digitally-altered image of the building was used to represent the 1996 headquarters of villain Henry Starling (Ed Begley, Jr.). The building was again seen, this time on a matte painting depicting a building on the Mari homeworld in the Star Trek: Voyager episode "Random Thoughts" in 1997.

The building was also home to the Southern California Regional Rail Authority (Metrolink) from 2011 to 2018.

Criticism

Prior to its completion, the building was criticized for its use of expensive construction materials as a public agency. One critic dubbed it as a "Taj Mahal" in reference to its Italian granite, English brick and a $300,000 aquarium. However, proponents of the project argued that it would spur development around Union Station and create a new public gathering place.

See also
List of tallest buildings in Los Angeles

References

Emporis: MTA Building
McLarand Vasquez Emsiek & Partners: MTA Headqiarters

Skyscraper office buildings in Los Angeles
Buildings and structures in Downtown Los Angeles
Government buildings in Los Angeles
Office buildings completed in 1995
1995 establishments in California
1990s architecture in the United States